The CB Series is an extensive line of Honda motorcycles. Most CB models are road-going motorcycles for commuting and cruising. The smaller CB models are also popular for vintage motorcycle racing. All CB series motorcycles have inline engines. The related Honda CBR series are sport bikes.

CB Models
CB50
CB90 Super Sport
CB100 Super Sport 
CB100N CB100N-A version also available
CB92 also known as Benly Super Sport
CB110 also known as CB Twister
CB125S
CB125E
CB125F
CB125T
CB125N
CB125TD Super Dream
CB125R
CB150F
CB150 Verza
CB150 Invicta
CB150/CB Trigger
CB150R Streetfire
CB150R ExMotion/Streetster
CB150X
CB160 Super Sport
CB160R Hornet (2015)
CB175 Super Sport
CB190R/CBF190R
CB200
CB200X (India)
CB250RS
CB250N Super Dream
CB250 G5
CB72 Hawk (250 cc)
CB250 Nighthawk
CB250 Jade
CB250F/Hornet 250
CB250F (2014)
CB250R
CB300F
CB300F (India)
CB300R
CB77 Super Hawk (305 cc)
CB350 H'Ness (made in India) (GB350 in Japan)
CB350 Super Sport CB350 RS (Cruiser Bike made in India) 
CB350F Four
CB360
CB360T
CB400
CB400N Super Dream
CB400A Hawk Hondamatic
CB400F Super Sport Four
CB400 SS
CB400 Super Four
CB400F CB-1
CB400T Hawk
CB400X 
Honda CB425
CB450 K0 to K5
CB450DX-K 1989 to 1992
CB450F 4 cylinders engine
CB450SC Nighthawk
CB450T Hawk
CB500T Twin 1974 to 1976
CB500 Four
CB500 DOHC Twin 1993 to 2004
CB500F 2013+ Standard motorcycle (471 cc twin)
CB500X 2013+ Adventure-style (471 cc twin)
CB550 Family of Fours
CB550SC Nighthawk
CB550K1,2,3,4 Standard Four
CB550F Super Sport Four
CB600F Hornet
CB650
CB650F
CB650C Custom
CB650SC Nighthawk
CB650R
CB700SC Nighthhawk 'S'
CB750 Four
CB750A Hondamatic
CB750C Custom
CB750F Super Sport
CB750SC Nighthawk
CB750 Hornet
CB900C Custom
CB900F
CB1000 Super Four
CB1000R
CB1000C Custom
CB1100
CB1100R
CB1100F
CB1100SF/X11
CB1300 Super Four
CB-1
CBX

* Note: unless otherwise stated the engine capacity in ccs can be derived from the number in the model reference.

References

CB series
Standard motorcycles